The 1962–63 Nationalliga A season was the 25th season of the Nationalliga A, the top level of ice hockey in Switzerland. 10 teams participated in the league, and HC Villars won the championship.

Regular season

Relegation 
 EHC Basel-Rotweiss - Grasshopper-Club 0:7/2:5

External links
 Championnat de Suisse 1962/63

Swiss
National League (ice hockey) seasons
1962–63 in Swiss ice hockey